The Long Patrol is a fantasy novel by Brian Jacques, published in 1997. It is the tenth book published and the twelfth chronologically in the Redwall series, and it was a New York Times bestseller.

Plot summary

Tamello De Fformelo Tussock (or Tammo), a young hare who lives at Camp Tussock, longs to be part of the Long Patrol at Salamandastron. However, his father, Cornspurrey De Fformelo Tussock, will not hear of it. He believes that his son is too young to join up.

Against her husband's wishes, Tammo's mother, Mem Divinia, prepares for him to leave during the night with Russa Nodrey, a wandering squirrel who is a friend of the family. The two then set off to find the Long Patrol. Along the way, they encounter the ferrets Skulka and Gromal. They do eventually meet up with the Long Patrol, but Russa is killed saving a baby badger, who is named Russano by one of the hares, Rockjaw Grang, in Russa's honour.

Meanwhile, Gormad Tunn, the rat leader of the Rapscallion army has been dying from mortal wounds. The Rapscallions are in fear of Cregga Rose Eyes, the ruler of Salamandastron. Tunn's two sons, Byral Fleetclaw and Damug Warfang, fight to the death to determine who will be the new commander of the Rapscallions. Damug kills Byral through treachery and takes over control of the army, which he commands to move inland.

At Redwall Abbey, the inhabitants discover that the south wall is mysteriously sinking into the ground. Foremole Diggum and his crew believe the best thing to do is to knock the wall down and re-build it. During the night, a storm brings a tree down on the wall, making the moles' job easier but also leaving the Abbey open to attack. The broken wall reveals a well, which turns out to be part of the ancient castle Kotir. Abbess Tansy, Friar Butty, Shad the Gatekeeper, Giygas, and Craklyn the Recorder investigate below. After a harrowing journey, they find the treasure of Verdauga Greeneyes, the long-dead lord of Kotir.

The Long Patrol goes to Redwall, hoping to inform the denizens about the threat posed by Damug. At the abbey, the spirit of Martin the Warrior appears to Tammo, instructing him to go in the company of the hare Midge Manycoats to Damug's camp. Disguised as a vermin seer, Midge advises Damug not to attack the vulnerable abbey directly, but suggests an alternate place and time instead, buying the defenders precious time to prepare themselves.

When the hare Rockjaw Grang is killed by the Rapscallions, Cregga's dreams direct her to the ridge where Midge has directed the battle to occur. Meanwhile, the Redwallers have gathered all the allies they can find, and with the Long Patrol, they battle a losing effort against the rat hordes. At a crucial point in the battle when it seems Damug has won, Lady Cregga Rose Eyes appears with the rest of the Salamandastron hares. She seizes Damug and strangles him, but he hacks at her face, blinding her in the process. The hares and Redwallers are eventually victorious, and the treasure brought back from Kotir by the Friar Butty is melted down into medals for the creatures that fought in battle. The ridge is named The Ridge of a Thousand after the vermin horde that lost all thousand of their number.

In the end, Tammo marries the beautiful Pasque Valerian, the healer of the Long Patrol, and travels to Salamandastron. Cregga remains at Redwall Abbey as the new Badger Mother, and Russano, later on, journeys to Salamandastron, with Russa's hardwood stick as his weapon. He will turn out to be one of the only Badger Lords never to be possessed by the Bloodwrath (the berserker rage Cregga and others suffered from).

Characters in The Long Patrol

Tamello De Fformelo Tussock (Tammo)
Cornspurrey De Fformelo Tussock
Mem Divinia
Russa Nodrey
Russano the Wise
Long Patrol
Major Périgord Habile Sinistra
Captain Twayblade Sinistra
Pasque Valerian
Rockjaw Grang
Midge Manycoats
Drill Sergeant Clubrush
Galloper Riffle Swiftback
Galloper Algador Swiftback
Lance Corporal Ellbrig
Shangle Widepad
Sergeant Torgoch
Lieutenant Morio
Corporal Rubbadub
Colonel Eyebright
Tare and Turry
Trowbaggs
Deodar
Furgale
Reeve Starbuck
Cheeva
Gormad Tunn
Byral Fleetclaw
Damug Warfang
Arven
Cregga Rose Eyes
Foremole Diggum
Abbess Tansy
Friar Butty
Shad the Gatekeeper
Craklyn the Recorder

Book divisions (English) 
Book 1: The Runaway Recruit
Book 2: A Gathering of Warriors
Book 3: The Ridge

Translations
(Finnish) Jänisten kaukopartio
(French) Rougemuraille : La Patrouille
Tome 1 : La Fugue de Tammo
Tome 2 : Les Pièges de Mousseray
Tome 3 : Sous les remparts de Rougemuraille
Tome 4 : La Crête des mille
(Italian) La Pattuglia Delle Dune
(Swedish) Långa Patrullen
(Russian) "Дозорный отряд"

References

1997 British novels
Children's fantasy novels
British children's novels
British fantasy novels
Redwall books
Hutchinson (publisher) books
1997 children's books
1997 fantasy novels
Books about rabbits and hares